Damien Finbarr Delaney (born 20 July 1981) is an Irish former professional footballer who played as a defender.

Delaney began his career at Cork City. He later played for Leicester City, Hull City and Queens Park Rangers before moving to Ipswich Town in 2009. He became a free agent after leaving the club in August 2012. He then signed for Crystal Palace and was a vital player in the centre of defence in their promotion season. He played for the club for six seasons and rejoined former club Cork City on 1 July 2018, after his contract expired. He departed Leeside at the end of the 2018 season and on 3 January 2019 it was announced that he had signed a one year deal with Waterford.

Delaney announced his retirement on Twitter on 4 July 2019.  Since his retirement he has become a pundit for Virgin Media Sport Ireland appearing on coverage of UEFA Champions League, UEFA Europa League, UEFA Europa Conference League, UEFA Nations League and UEFA European Qualifiers.

Early life
Born in Cork, Delaney attended Coláiste Chríost Rí and began his career at local club Avondale United at schoolboy level before moving on to Cork City.

He also played Gaelic football with the Cork minor team. Delaney was a Munster minor football winner with the team in 1999 and shone for his club, St Michael's. He struck 2–2 in an All-Ireland semi-final defeat to Mayo that year, before he committed fully to soccer.

Club career

Leicester City and Hull City
He was brought to England by Peter Taylor at Leicester City, where he made eight FA Premier League appearances. He had spells on loan at Stockport County, Huddersfield Town and Mansfield Town. Whilst at Stockport, he scored his first career goal in a match against Rotherham United. Taylor later made Delaney his first signing for Hull City, on 16 October 2002, for a fee of £50,000.

After a rocky start to his career at Hull, during which time he was tried in midfield and at left-back, Delaney was played regularly at centre back and began to grow in stature and consistency. He was voted Player of the Year in the 2003–04 promotion-winning season, additionally his strike against Rochdale was voted Goal of the Season.

In the 2005–06 season in the Championship, he played mainly at centre back, but also at left-back when two players in that position were injured, and in midfield when the manager felt that more height and solidity were required. This versatility made him a key asset to the Tigers squad.

Delaney was the last Hull City player to score a goal at their old ground Boothferry Park, prior to their move to the KC Stadium.

Queens Park Rangers
On 18 January 2008 Delaney signed for Queens Park Rangers on a three-and-a-half-year contract. On 8 March 2008 Delaney scored his first goal for QPR in a 2–1 away defeat to Sheffield Wednesday.

Ipswich Town
On 2 July 2009, Delaney signed for Ipswich Town on a two-year contract for a fee of £750,000, £250,000 if Ipswich reached the play-offs and an extra £100,000 after he has made 50 appearances for the club. He suffered a freak injury in the following year's pre-season which could ultimately have cost him his life - a blood clot in his thigh. He was rushed to an emergency surgery procedure that resolved the issue. He scored his first goal for the club in the East Anglian derby in November 2010, before being sent off following a straight red card.  He left the club by mutual consent in August 2012.

Crystal Palace
On 31 August 2012, following his departure from Ipswich, Delaney signed for Crystal Palace on a short-term contract until January 2013. He scored his first goal for the club in Palace's 4–3 comeback against Burnley on 6 October. Due to Delaney's impressive start to his Palace career, he signed a new contract on 22 November 2012, which expired summer 2014.
He scored his first ever goal in the Premier League in a 3–3 draw against Liverpool, with his initial 25-yard shot deflected slightly into the net by Glen Johnson. Palace were 3–0 down at the time, but Delaney's goal combined with two goals from Dwight Gayle made it 3–3. Delaney was a regular for Palace for their first four seasons back in the Premier League and stayed at the club until the end of the 2017–18 season, making a total of 193 appearances in all competitions, scoring seven goals.

Return to Cork City
After the end of the 2017–18 Premier League season, Cork City announced that Delaney had signed with the club, and returned on 1 July 2018 after his contract with Palace expired and the Irish transfer window opened. He made 14 appearances, scoring one goal, before leaving the club at the end of the season.

Waterford
At the start of 2019, Delaney signed for Waterford for the 2019 season.

International career
On 13 May 2008, Delaney was called up to the Republic of Ireland squad for the first time by the new manager Giovanni Trapattoni. On 4 May 2011, he was called into the Irish squad for the 2011 Nations Cup games against Northern Ireland and Scotland. On 24 May 2011, he started and played the full 90 minutes against Northern Ireland as Ireland beat them 5–0. On 11 October 2013, he made a belated competitive debut in a World Cup qualifier against Germany.

Career statistics

Club

International
Source:

Honours
Cork City
League of Ireland Cup: 1998–99

Hull City
Football League Third Division runner-up: 2003–04
Football League One runner-up: 2004–05

Crystal Palace
Football League Championship play-offs: 2013
FA Cup runner-up: 2015–16

Republic of Ireland
Nations Cup: 2011

Individual
Hull City Player of the Year: 2003–04

References

External links

1981 births
Living people
People educated at Coláiste Chríost Rí
Association footballers from Cork (city)
Republic of Ireland association footballers
Republic of Ireland international footballers
Republic of Ireland expatriate association footballers
Expatriate footballers in England
Irish expatriate sportspeople in England
Association football defenders
Cork City F.C. players
Leicester City F.C. players
Stockport County F.C. players
Huddersfield Town A.F.C. players
Mansfield Town F.C. players
Hull City A.F.C. players
Queens Park Rangers F.C. players
Ipswich Town F.C. players
Crystal Palace F.C. players
Waterford F.C. players
League of Ireland players
Premier League players
English Football League players
FA Cup Final players